Vernon is an Incorporated town. Incorporated in 1985 as the "Town of Vernon" in McIntosh County, Oklahoma, United States.  Its elevation is 696 feet (212 m).

History
Vernon was plotted in 1910 and established in 1911 as an all-black community, it became an incorporated town in 1985 and is one of thirteen remaining All Black towns of Oklahoma. It was named for Bishop William Tecumseh Vernon of the African Methodist Episcopal Church.

The Fort Smith and Western Railway, which opened in 1899 and closed in 1939, operated through the town. The FS&W served major coal mining operations in eastern Oklahoma at Coal Creek, Bokoshe and McCurtain. Other towns served included Crowder, Okemah, Boley, Prague, Vernon, Indianola and Meridian. A major portion of the road's freight traffic was metallurgical-grade coal from San Bois Coal Company mines near McCurtain. However, the railroad was ultimately abandoned after the Great Depression.

A post office was established in 1912.  Several post masters presided throughout the years. Ella Woods was the first and Mrs. Tennie Baccus Dozier Walker was the last.  She retired around 1991, and several temporary workers kept it open for several months, until it was finally closed when the postal service consolidated all workers under the civil service dept and began eliminating and consolidating small town post offices across the state.  It was originally housed in a small frame building on Broadway, until the retirement of Mrs. Woodard then was moved across the street to Crawford Dozier's 2 story rock building when Mrs. Tennie Baccus Dozier became Postmaster.  The 2-story rock building began as a Shoe store and Dry Goods store in 1915 and has been many things through the years, including recreation center, Rock Front Club, a tavern and pool hall, Post Office, and finally Mr. G's Grocery Store operated by George Dozier Sr. until his death in 2000.  Mrs. Tennie Baccus Dozier Walker had Billy Dozier convert it from a 2-story building to the current 1 story building around 1974.  It is listed on the National Register of Historic Places in 1984.

The town is also home to the Vernon Duty Hill Cemetery.

See also
 Boley, Brooksville, Clearview, Grayson, Langston, Lima, Redbird, Rentiesville, Summit, Taft, Tatums, and Tullahassee, other "All-Black" settlements that were part of the Land Run of 1889.

References

Further reading

External links 
 Vernon’s Rock Front Post Office – Historical Information from okstate.edu
 All-Black Towns in Oklahoma from okstate.edu

Unincorporated communities in McIntosh County, Oklahoma
Unincorporated communities in Oklahoma
Populated places in Oklahoma established by African Americans
Pre-statehood history of Oklahoma